Pontic is a proposed language family or macrofamily, comprising the Indo-European and Northwest Caucasian language families, with Proto-Pontic being its reconstructed proto-language.

History of the proposal
The internal reconstruction of the Indo-European proto-language done by Émile Benveniste and Winfred P. Lehmann has set Proto-Indo-European (PIE) typologically quite apart from its daughters. In 1960, Aert Kuipers noticed the parallels between a Northwest Caucasian language, Kabardian, and PIE. It was Paul Friedrich in 1964, however, who first suggested that PIE might be phylogenetically related to Proto-Caucasian.

In 1981, John Colarusso examined typological parallels involving consonantism, focusing on the so-called laryngeals of PIE and in 1989, he published his reconstruction of Proto-Northwest Caucasian (PNWC). Eight years later, the first results of his comparative work on PNWC and PIE were published in his article Proto-Pontic: Phyletic Links Between Proto-Indo-European and Proto-Northwest Caucasian, an event which may be considered the actual beginning of the hypothesis.

Evidence

Examples of similarities that have been noted include:

 Nasal negating particles in both families:
 PIE : Germanic , Romance ,  Slavic .
 NWC: Ubykh , Abkhaz .
 A case variously named "accusative", "oblique" or "objective", marked with nasal suffixes:
 PIE accusative , reflected e.g. in Latin  'moon' (nom.) vs  (acc.), or Ancient Greek  (nom.) vs.  (acc.).
 NWC: Ubykh  'well (water source)' (abs.) vs  (obl.).

References
 

Proposed language families
Indo-European linguistics
Pre-Indo-Europeans
Indo-European languages
1997 in science